St. Nicholas round open was held between 1960 and 1976. Both men and women competed in the event.

Men's events

Men's St. Nicholas round open

Men's St. Nicholas round team open

Men's St. Nicholas round (cervical)

Men's St. Nicholas round (paraplegic)

Men's St. Nicholas round open (tetraplegic)

Mixed events

Mixed St. Nicholas round open (paraplegic)

Mixed St. Nicholas round open (tetraplegic)

Women's events

Women's St. Nicholas round open

Women's St. Nicholas round open (cervical)

Women's St. Nicholas round open (paraplegic)

Women's St. Nicholas round open (tetraplegic) 

Defunct events at the Summer Paralympics
Archery at the Summer Paralympics